Limburg or Limbourg may refer to:

Regions
 Limburg (Belgium), a province since 1839 in the Flanders region of Belgium
 Limburg (Netherlands), a province since 1839 in the south of the Netherlands
 Diocese of Limburg, Roman Catholic Diocese in Germany
 Province of Limburg (1815–1839), a former province of the United Kingdom of the Netherlands
 Duchy of Limburg (1065–1794), a state in the Holy Roman Empire
 Duchy of Limburg (1839–1867), a part of the German Confederation
 Limburg of the States (1633–1685), one of the Generality Lands, a dependent territory of the United Provinces of the Netherlands

Other places
 Limbourg, a town in Liège, Wallonia, Belgium
 Limburg (Weilheim an der Teck), a mountain in Baden-Württemberg, Germany
 Limburg an der Lahn, a city, the district seat of Limburg-Weilburg,  Hesse, Germany
 Limburg an der Lenne, now called Hagen-Hohenlimburg,  North Rhine-Westphalia, Germany, the former chief town of the county of Limburg-Hohenlimburg
 Limburg, a castle in Sasbach am Kaiserstuhl,  Baden-Württemberg, Germany
 Limburg Abbey, a ruined abbey near Bad Dürkheim,  Rhineland-Palatinate, Germany
 Limburg Airfield, an abandoned World War II military airfield near Limburg an der Lahn, Hessen, Germany

People
 Limbourg brothers (fl. 1385–1416), Dutch painters Herman, Paul, and Johan
 Various members of the German higher nobility and mediatised House of Limburg-Stirum
 Baermann of Limburg, German writer 
 Helge Limburg (born 1982), German politician
 Olga Limburg (1881–1970), German actor
 Peter Limbourg (born 1960), German journalist

Other uses
 Limburg (tanker), a French oil tanker bombed off Yemen
 HNLMS Limburg (D814), a destroyer of the Dutch navy

See also 
 Limberg (disambiguation)
 Limburg-Weilburg, a Kreis (district) in the west of Hesse, Germany
 Limburgish, a language
 Limburger